= Ofanim (charity) =

Israeli nonprofit organization

Ofanim is an Israeli nonprofit organization that brings education to some of the poorest and most remote villages in Israel through mobile classrooms.
